Nabam Rebia is an Indian politician of the Bharatiya Janata Party. He is Member of the Parliament of India representing Arunachal Pradesh in the Rajya Sabha, the upper house of the Indian Parliament. He was a speaker of the Arunachal Pradesh Legislative Assembly.

He earlier was a Member of the Parliament of India representing Arunachal Pradesh in the Rajya Sabha, as a member of the Congress party. He is the EX-MLA from Arunachal's constituency of Doimukh and minister of Urban Development, Town Planning, Housing, Urban Local Bodies and Law and Justice in BJP-led Pema Khandu government in Arunachal Pradesh.

References

External links
 Profile on Rajya Sabha website 

People from Yupia
Living people
Rajya Sabha members from Arunachal Pradesh
Speakers of the Arunachal Pradesh Legislative Assembly
People's Party of Arunachal politicians
Indian National Congress politicians
Bharatiya Janata Party politicians from Arunachal Pradesh
Arunachal Pradesh MLAs 2009–2014
Arunachal Pradesh MLAs 2014–2019
State cabinet ministers of Arunachal Pradesh
1962 births